Wanghai Road is a road along the southern coastline of Shekou, Nanshan, in the South China city of Shenzhen (in Guangdong Province, China).

Wanghai Road is 6.6 kilometres long and runs nearly throughout the east coast of Shekou. It stretches from at Shekou Sea World in the South, runs along the upmarket residences of Nanhai Rose Garden and Coastal Rose Garden and terminates at the promenade on the northern end of Shekou at Dongbin Road at Shenzhen Bay Park.

Notable places along the road

A number of Chinese and expat residences lie along Wanghai Road, including:
 Hai Xin Flower Garden
 Coastal Rose Garden
 Peninsula City
 Shekou International School
 Shenzhen Bay Park
 Imperial Park
 Hilton Hotel (Shekou)
 Sea World (Shenzhen)

See also
Binhai Boulevard, a major expressway also running along the southern coastline of Nanshan
Xinghua Road, Shenzhen

References

Nanshan District, Shenzhen
Roads in Shenzhen